ACPM Medical College, or Jawahar Medical Foundation's Annasaheb Chudaman Patil Memorial Medical College, is a medical college in Dhule, Maharashtra affiliated to Maharashtra University of Health Sciences (M.U.H.S., Nashik).

History
Jawahar Medical Foundation was the concept of philanthropist, social worker and politician Late. Annasaheb Chudaman Patil. The foundation was registered in 1984. From a small charitable general hospital with only 150 beds, ACPM hospital has grown and now has 500 beds, an Intensive Coronary Care Unit (ICCU), Intensive Care Unit (ICU), Neonatal  Intensive Critical  Unit (NICU), Paediatric Intensive care Unit (PICU), CT - SCAN and a blood bank amongst other facilities.

Major Milestones
The following are the major milestones in the institute's history.
 1990     Establishment of ACPM Medical college
 1996  Establishment of JMF'S Nursing Training College
 1999  Post graduate Diploma course of College of Physicians and Surgeons started in all clinical branches in the medical college.
 2002  Establishment of ACPM Dental College with 100 seats, recognized by the Dental council of India. It is affiliated to Maharashtra University of Health Sciences, Nashik.
 2006  Establishment of ACPM College of Physiotherapy and ACPM College of B.Sc. Nursing 
 2007  Post Graduate Courses in the subjects of Medicine, Surgery, Gynaecology, Paediatrics, Pathology and Microbiology started.

Admission
Prior to 2006, the admission to the institute was through the MH-CET. However, currently, the admission to ACPMMC is via Asso-CET, the entrance exam conducted by the Association of Private Unaided Medical and Dental Colleges. The exam is held each year in April–June. As of 2016, the admission process will take place through the NEET exam as per the Supreme Court decision on NEET dated on 9 May 2016

Achievements
Seri Joseph Abraham of Class of 2001 was the recipient of the ’Dr Suhdakar Sane Gold Medal’ and ’Late Smt Vijayadevi Phadtare Memorial Gold Medal’ in 2008 for securing the highest marks in General Medicine and Medicine of Third MBBS (Part II) amongst all the students of medical colleges affiliated to Maharashtra University of Health Sciences.

References

External links
 ACPM Medical College
  ACPM Medical College

Medical colleges in Maharashtra
Dhule
Educational institutions established in 1990
1990 establishments in Maharashtra
Affiliates of Maharashtra University of Health Sciences